Mahbub Jamal Zahedi also known as M J Zahedi (21 June 1929 – 7 December 2008) was a veteran journalist and philatelist from Pakistan. During a career of nearly fifty years he served as editor of the Khaleej Times, Dubai, UAE as well the news editor and senior assistant editor of Dawn, Karachi, Pakistan.

Early and personal life
Mahbub Jamal Zahedi was born in Dhaka in 1929. He was the son of Mizanur Rahman, the census commissioner in former East Pakistan. Zahedi studied English Literature at the University of Dhaka. He was married to Qamarunissa Begum, and had two daughters, Jamila and Selina, and a son, Dilawar. In 2003, Zahedi suffered a stroke that rendered him paralysed and bedridden.

Career
Mahbub Jamal Zahedi had a journalistic career that spanned nearly five decades. He served in several newspapers in the then East Pakistan and West Pakistan in key positions, as well as going on assignments to Lagos, Nigeria; Sydney and Melbourne, Australia and Beijing, China. Due to his left-wing views, he was jailed on several occasions. He was also the founder and editor of the popular Bangladeshi periodical The Agatya, in then East Pakistan.

1950s 
Zahedi started his career in the early 1950s working for the Pakistan Observer. By the early 1960s he held the position of assistant editor.

He was also a Colombo Plan journalism scholar in Australia in 1955 and worked with the Sydney Morning Herald and the Melbourne Gazette.

On 7 October 1958, he was arrested late at night near Purana Paltan, Dhaka, his then place of residence, while returning home after finishing some routine desk work. The reason for the arrest was the publication of a controversial story reading that the Constitution of Pakistan of 1956 had been abrogated by Iskandar Mirza.

1960s 
In 1960, Zahedi covered the UN General Assembly Session. After his stint with the Pakistan Observer, Zahedi moved to Lahore to work in the Pakistan Times, which was then edited by the renowned poet Faiz Ahmed Faiz. He also taught journalism at the University of Dhaka from 1960 to 1962 as a part-time lecturer.

After Pakistan Times was taken over by the National Press Trust, he served for a short period with the Civil and Military Gazette in 1963, quickly moving to Dawn within the year at the invitation of its editor, Altaf Husain, where he was given the position of news editor.

1970-80s 
In 1970, Zahedi was elected Secretary General of Pakistan Writers' Guild. In the same year he also covered the UN enquiry into allegations of genocide in Nigeria.

He left Dawn in 1974 to move to Dubai to help launch the Khaleej Times, the first English newspaper in the Middle-East, where with Mahmoud Haroon he rose to become one of its establishing editors. He held the position of Khaleej Times editor for over a decade.

1990-2000s 
In 1991, Zahedi rejoined Dawn, this time as assistant editor. He published both his books on philately in the mid-90s. He retired from journalism in 2001 following a stroke.

Philatelist
Zahedi is the author of two books, one on Pakistan's stamps and the other on the stamps of Gulf nations. He also published articles on the subject in some of the world's most prestigious related magazines, including Britain's Gibbons Stamp Monthly and America's Scott catalogue.

Death
On 7 December 2008, Zahedi died in bed of natural causes, succumbing to a prolonged paralysis.

Pakistani Prime Minister Syed Yousaf Raza Gillani expressed grief over his demise, and offered condolences to his family. He also eulogized Zahedi's valuable contribution in the field of journalism within and outside of Pakistan, which he said would be long remembered.

Books
 Zahedi, Mahbub Jamal (1997) Fifty Years of Pakistan Stamps, Sanaa Publications, Karachi, Pakistan.
 Zahedi, Mahbub Jamal (1994) Gulf post: Story of the post in the Gulf, Sanaa Publications, Karachi, Pakistan

References

1929 births
2008 deaths
Philatelic literature
Pakistani philatelists
Pakistani male journalists
Bengali writers
Pakistani people of Bangladeshi descent
Pakistani people of Bengali descent
People from Dhaka
University of Dhaka alumni
Academic staff of the University of Dhaka
Dawn (newspaper) people
Philately of Pakistan
Journalists from Karachi
Pakistani expatriates in the United Arab Emirates
20th-century Bengalis
21st-century Bengalis
Pakistani magazine founders